Michurinsky is a rural locality (a settlement) and the administrative center of Michurinskoye Rural Settlement, Kamyshinsky District, Volgograd Oblast, Russia. The population was 2,276 as of 2010. There are 14 streets.

Geography 
Michurinsky is located in forest steppe, on the Volga Upland, 7 km north of Kamyshin (the district's administrative centre) by road. Torpovka is the nearest rural locality.

References 

Rural localities in Kamyshinsky District